The following is a list of countries by wheat exports. Data is for 2020 as reported in Food and Agriculture Organization Corporate Statistical Database. Wheat is one of the biggest crops in the international grain trade, alongside other crops like maize (corn), rice and soybean.

References 

Wheat
Wheat